Vasko Božinovski (born 11 March 1975) is a retired footballer from the Republic of Macedonia who played most of his career as a central defender for Makedonija Gjorče Petrov.

International career 
He made his senior debut for Macedonia in a January 2004 friendly match away against China and has earned a total of 16 caps, scoring no goals. His final international was a March 2006 friendly match against Bulgaria in Skopje.

References

External links
Macedonian football 

1975 births
Living people
Footballers from Skopje
Association football defenders
Macedonian footballers
North Macedonia international footballers
FK Makedonija Gjorče Petrov players
NK Osijek players
NK Kamen Ingrad players
FK Rabotnički players
FK Vardar players
Macedonian First Football League players
Croatian Football League players
Macedonian Second Football League players
Macedonian expatriate footballers
Expatriate footballers in Croatia
Macedonian expatriate sportspeople in Croatia